Best in the World is a professional wrestling event, held annually by the Ring of Honor (ROH) promotion. The initial Best in the World event took place as a part of the "Milestone Series" in 2006. In 2011, it became an annual internet pay-per-view (iPPV) for Ring of Honor, taking place in June.
In 2014, it became an annual Live pay-per-view (PPV) for Ring of Honor, taking place in June.

Dates and venues

See also 
ROH's annual events

References

External links 
Ring of Honor's official site